Byron H. Dunbar (June 8, 1927 – April 21, 2007) was an American attorney who served as the United States Attorney for the District of Montana from 1981 to 1990.

He died on April 21, 2007, in Billings, Montana at age 79.

References

1927 births
2007 deaths
United States Attorneys for the District of Montana
Montana Republicans